This page lists all of the numbered county roads in Middlesex County, Ontario.

Note: when London became a separated municipality and absorbed Westminster Township, numbered County Roads in the township lost their designation. Many roads such as the former County Road 37 (Highland Avenue) are now named only.

Several roads near London were formerly provincial highways, but were not renumbered as County Roads when the highway designation was dropped.
 Highway 100: Airport Road (now "Veterans Memorial Parkway", proposed ring road around London.
 Highway 126: Highbury Avenue from Highway 401 (exit 189) to Fanshawe Park Road. The portion of Highbury Avenue from the Thames River to Highway 401 was once known as the Wenige Expressway.
 Highway 135: Exeter Road. Turned back after Highway 402 was completed and rendered the designation redundant.

The reason for this somewhat high concentration of former provincially controlled roads in this county is due to London's size (roughly 340,000), as it is the anchor for Southwestern Ontario, and Middlesex County is geographically quite large (by southern Ontario standards), and is quite important due to agriculture in the area.

Transport in Middlesex County, Ontario
Middlesex